Sabrisho I (also Sabr-Ishu, Syriac for "hope in Jesus") was Patriarch of the Church of the East from 596 to 604, during the rule of King Khosrau II.

The son of a shepherd from the mountainous region of Shahrizur, Sabrisho had been a hermit, and was a strong supporter of the monastic way of life, so was influential in integrating monasticism into the church. Another strong supporter of monasticism at the time was Abraham the Great of Kashkar.

Conflicts during Sabrisho's tenure included that of Henana of Adiabene.

Upon Sabrisho's death in 604, there was a power struggle over the election of a new Patriarch, between the King, his wife, and the Synod (council) of bishops.

Sources
 
 
 

604 deaths
Patriarchs of the Church of the East
Year of birth unknown
Christians in the Sasanian Empire
6th-century bishops of the Church of the East
7th-century bishops of the Church of the East